Pont is a surname. Notable people with the surname include:

Charles E. Pont, American artist
John Pont, American college football coach
Mike Pont, singer
Mónica Pont, Spanish long-distance runner
Robert Pont, 16th century Scottish reformer
Timothy Pont, Scottish mapmaker of the late 16th century